The Bliss automobile was manufactured by the E. W. Bliss Company of Brooklyn, New York, in 1906. The company was founded in 1867 and for a short duration, diversified into automobile manufacturing.

References

External links 
E. W. Bliss Company: Torpedoes and Telegraph Codes - Brooklyn Public Library, 2011

Brass Era vehicles
Defunct motor vehicle manufacturers of the United States
Motor vehicle manufacturers based in New York (state)
Defunct manufacturing companies based in New York (state)
American companies established in 1906
Vehicle manufacturing companies established in 1906
Vehicle manufacturing companies disestablished in 1906
1906 establishments in New York City